Leon is a first name of Greek origin-the Greek λέων (léon; leōn), meaning "lion," has spawned the Latin "Leo," French "Lyon," Irish "Leon" and Spanish "León." Perhaps the oldest attested historical figure to bear this name was Leon of Sparta, a 6th-century BCE king of Sparta, while in Greek mythology Leon was a Giant killed by Heracles. During the Christian era Leon was merged with the Latin cognate Leo, with the result that the two forms are used interchangeably. A similar Greek name to Leon is Leonidas, meaning "son of a lion", with Leonidas I, king of Sparta, being perhaps the most famous bearer of that name.

Leon (English, German, Dutch, Russian version) or Léon (French version) or León (Spanish version) may refer to:

Etymology
Ancient Greek λέων from Proto-Semitic *labiʾ- (not Indo-European).

People
 Leon (mathematician) (fl. 400 BC), Greek mathematician, precursor of Euclid
 Leon of Modena (1571–1648), Venetian scholar
 Leon of Pella, Macedonian historian
 Leon of Phlius (fl. ~620 BC), tyrant of his city
 Leon of Salamis (died 406 or 403 BC), Athenian politician and naval commander
 Leon of Sparta, Spartan king
 León Aillaud (1880–1936), Mexican politician 
 Leon Ashley (1936–2013), American country music singer and songwriter
 Léon Bakst (1866-1924), Russian painter and scene- and costume designer
 Leon Bates (1899–1972), American union leader
 Leon Belasco (1902 – 1988), Russian-American musician and actor
 Leon Benois (1856–1928), Russian architect
 Leon Berkowitz (1911–1987), American abstract painter
 Leon Berry (1914-1996), American organist
 Leon Best (born 1986), Irish football player 
 Léon Bloy (1846–1917), French writer
 Léon Blum (1872–1950), French politician and Prime Minister
 Léon Boëllmann (1862–1897), French composer
 Leon Bourgeois (1851–1925), French politician and Prime Minister
 Léon Breitling (1860–1914), Swiss watchmaker and businessman
 Leon Brittan (1939–2015), British politician
 Leon Burns (1942–1984), American football player
 Leon Camier (born 1986), British motorcycle racer
 Léon Chagnaud (1866–1930), French businessman and politician.
 Leon Chua, a Chinese-American scientist and professor at the University of California, Berkeley
 Leon Cooper (born 1930), American physicist and Nobel Prize laureate
 Leon Cooperman (1943–) American billionaire investor, hedge fund manager
 Leon Czolgosz (1873–1901), American anarchist
 Leon Dănăilă (1933-), Romanian neurosurgeon 
 Léon Dierx (1838–1912), French poet
 Léon Dion (1922–1997), Canadian political scientist
 Leon Draisaitl (1995-), German ice hockey player
 Leon Durham (born 1957), American baseball player
 Leon Edel (1907–1997), American writer and literary critic
 Leon Edney (born 1935), American admiral
 Léon Arthur Elchinger (1908–1998), French Catholic archbishop
 León Febres Cordero (1931–2008), Ecuadorian politician and President
 Leon Feldhendler (1910–1945), Polish Jewish resistance fighter
 León Felipe (1884–1968), Spanish poet
 Leon Fleisher (born 1928), American pianist and conductor
 Léon Foucault (1819–1868), French physicist 
 Leon Friedman (legal scholar) (born 1933), American legal scholar
 Leon Friedman (politician) (1886 – 1948), American politician
 Léon Gambetta (1838–1882), French politician and Prime Minister
 Leon Garfield (1921–1996), British author
 Léon Gaumont (1864–1946), French inventor and industrialist
 Léon Gérin (1863–1951), Canadian lawyer
 León Gieco (born 1951), Argentinian musician and interpreter
 Leon Goldensohn (born 1911), American psychiatrist and author of The Nuremberg Interviews
 Leon M. Goldstein (died 1999), American President of Kingsborough Community College, and acting Chancellor of the City University of New York
 Léon Goossens (1897–1988), British oboist
 Léon Guérin (1807-1885), French author, poet, and naval historian
 Leon Haslam (born 1983), British motorcycle racer
 Leon Hatziioannou (born 1965), Canadian football player
 León Herrera Esteban (1922–2003), Spanish military officer and politician
 Leon Jackson (born 1988), Scottish singer
 Leon Quincy Jackson (1926/1927–1995), American architect and professor
 Leon Jacobs (born 1995), American football player
 Leon James (born 2001), Thai footballer
 Leon Jaworski (1905–1982), American lawyer 
 Leon Johnson (disambiguation), multiple people
 Leon S. Kennedy (character), protagonist of horror video game series Resident Evil
 León Klimovsky (1906–1996), Argentine film director, screenwriter and film producer
 Leon Klinghoffer (1916–1985), a Jewish-American man who was murdered
 Leon Koudelak (born 1961), Czech guitarist
 Leon Krier (born 1986), Luxembourg architect
 Leon Lai (born 1966), Hong Kong actor and singer
 Leon Lederman (1922–2018), American physicist and Nobel Prize winner
 Leon Leyson (1929–2013), Polish-American Holocaust survivor and author
 Léon Augustin Lhermitte (1844–1925), French painter and etcher 
 Leon McKenzie (born 1978), British football player
 Leon McQuay III (born 1994), American football player
 Leon Parker Miller (1899–1980), American lawyer, politician, and judge
 Leon Milo (born 1956), American musician
 Leon Moser (1942–1995), American murderer
 Léon Motchane (1900–1990), French industrialist and mathematician. Founder of the Institut des Hautes Études Scientifiques in Bures-sur-Yvette
 Leon Orr (born 1992), American football player
 Leon Panetta (born 1938), American politician 
 Leon Pescheret (1892–1971), British-American designer, watercolorist, etcher, and illustrator. 
 Léon Pétillon (1903–1996), Belgian politician
 Léon Abel Provancher (1820–1892), Canadian priest and naturalist 
 Leon Punch (1928–1991), Australian politician 
 Leon Radosevic (born 1990), Croatian basketball player
 Leon Redbone (1949–2019), American singer and songwriter
 Leon Robinson (born 1962), American actor and singer 
 Leon Rotman (born 1934), Romanian canoer 
 Leon Russell (1942–2016), American singer and songwriter
 Léon Say (1826–1896), French economist and politician
 Leon Schiller (1887–1954), Polish director and composer
 Leon Schlesinger (1884-1949), American film producer
 Léon Schlienger (1922–2002), French songwriter
 Leon Schuster (born 1951), South African filmmaker, actor and musician
 Leon Shamroy (1901–1974), American film cinematographer 
 Leon Simon (1881-1965), British intellectual and civil servant; President of the Hebrew University of Jerusalem
 Leon Sperling (1900–1941), Polish soccer player 
 Léon Spilliaert (1881–1946), Belgian painter 
 Leon Spinks (1953–2021), American boxer 
 Leon Sullivan (1922–2001), American civil rights leader
 Leon Sylvers III (born 1953), American singer, songwriter, record producer and multi-instrumentalist
 Leon Taylor (born 1977), British swimmer
 Léon Teisserenc de Bort (1855–1913), French meteorologist
 Léon Theremin (1896–1993), Russian inventor
 Leon Thijssen (born 1968), Dutch show jumper
 Leon Thomas III (born 1993), American actor
 Leon Topalian, American businessman, CEO of Nucor
 Leon Trotsky (1879–1940), Russian revolutionary and politician
 Leon Underwood (1890–1975), British sculptor, painter and writer
 Leon Uris (1924–2003), American novelist 
 Leon Vance (1916–1944), American aviators
 Leon V of Armenia (1342–1393), King of Armenia
 Léon Vaudoyer (1803–1872), French architect 
 Léon Walras (1834–1910), French economist 
 Leon Ware (born 1940), American singer, songwriter and producer 
 Leon White (1955–2018), American professional wrestler, better known as Big Van Vader
 Leon Wilkeson (1952–2001), American bassist, member of the rock band Lynyrd Skynyrd
 Leon Norman Williams (1914–1999), British barrister and philatelic writer

See also
Leo (given name)

References

English masculine given names
German masculine given names
Romanian masculine given names
Russian masculine given names
French masculine given names
Spanish masculine given names